The Baseball Show is a Major League Baseball talk show on ESPN Radio. It is heard every Sunday for three hours and thirty-five minutes from 4 p.m. ET to 7:35 p.m. ET during the Major League Baseball regular season. The program is hosted by GameNight personality Ryen Russillo (since 2007) and featured former New York Mets GM and former Baseball Tonight analyst Steve Phillips until his firing from ESPN. The show was previously hosted by Karl Ravech in 2005 and John Seibel in 2006.

For affiliates carrying the Sunday Night Baseball game on radio, The Baseball Show goes on leading up to the games at 8 p.m. ET.

Throughout the program, Russillo discusses some of the biggest stories in baseball and updates you on all of the happening around the league. They are often joined by either players or coaches following the games to get instant reaction. Dan Shulman joins the program weekly to discuss the Sunday Night Baseball game, which he calls on ESPN Radio. The Baseball Tonight update anchor is Joe D'Ambrosio.

For the 2008 post-season, ESPN Radio had SportsNation on ESPN Radio replaced for The Baseball Show on Tuesday through Thursday, typically leading up to the ESPN Radio baseball pre-game show for the late game, but hosts John Seibel and former MLB player Orestes Destrade kept the same responsibilities they have for SportsNation by hosting the 2 show, mostly focusing on baseball but with occasional football talk due to the season.

References
ESPN Radio show page
ESPN Radio.com

External links
ESPN Radio show page
ESPN Radio.com

American sports radio programs
ESPN Radio programs
Major League Baseball on the radio